Events from the year 1953 in North Korea.

Incumbents
Premier: Kim Il-sung 
Supreme Leader: Kim Il-sung

Events

 July 27 – The Korean War ends, with the Korean Armistice Agreement: The United Nations Command (Korea) (United States), People's Republic of China and North Korea sign an armistice agreement at Panmunjom, and the north remains communist, while the south remains capitalist.

Establishments

 North Korea Peace Museum

See also

Years in Japan
Years in South Korea

References

 
North Korea
1950s in North Korea
Years of the 20th century in North Korea
North Korea